is a judo kata that focuses on counter-attacks to throwing techniques.  It is not an officially recognized kata of judo, but its importance is attested to by its inclusion in Kawaishi's The complete seven katas of judo.  Writing in the early post-war period, Kawaishi described the kata as being practiced less in Japan than in Europe.

However, according to recent scholarly research, gonosen-no-kata likely never even existed in Japan. After Japanese judoka from Waseda University in Tokyo visited England in the 1920s and publicly demonstrated several counter-techniques developed at their home University, the exercises were henceforth in Britain (and later in France and other parts of Europe) represented as a formalized kata and practiced and taught that way by Kawaishi Mikinosuke, Koizumi Gunji, Ōtani Masutarō, and Tani Yukio.

Techniques
O soto Gari countered by O soto Gari
Hiza Guruma countered by Hiza Guruma
O uchi Gari countered by okuri ashi barai
De ashi Harai countered by De Ashi Barai
Ko soto Gake countered by Tai Otoshi
Ko uchi Gari countered by Sasae Tsurikomi Ashi
Kubi Nage / Tsuri goshi countered by Ushiro Goshi
Koshi Guruma countered by Uki Goshi
Hane Goshi countered by Sasae Tsurikomi Ashi
Harai Goshi countered by Utsuri Goshi
Uchi Mata countered by Te guruma
Seoi Nage countered by Sumi Gaeshi

External links

 Video of the Go no sen no kata at the JudoInfo.com web site.

References

Judo kata